Brunsden may refer to:

Edwin William Brunsden (1896–1976), Canadian agronomist and politician
Brunsden Lock, lock in on the Kennet and Avon Canal in Berkshire, England